Gorenje Medvedje Selo is a small settlement just north of Trebnje in eastern Slovenia. The Municipality of Trebnje lies in the historical region of Lower Carniola and is included in the Southeast Slovenia Statistical Region.

References

External links
Gorenje Medvedje Selo at Geopedia

Populated places in the Municipality of Trebnje